Dictyna major is a species of mesh web weaver in the spider family Dictynidae. It is found in North America, Europe, a range from Russia to Tajikistan, and China.

References

External links

 

Dictynidae
Articles created by Qbugbot
Spiders described in 1869